Sbrana Psychiatric Hospital is a public psychiatric hospital in Lobatse, Botswana.  It is situated to the north of the mall and was built on the site of the Botswana Prisons. Sbrana works as a referral hospital to  cater for everyone around Botswana.

History 
Sbrana psychiatric hospital is a national referral health institution that serves the community of Botswana. It was established in 2010 after being converted from Lobatse mental clinic to a psychiatric hospital. Sbrana is affiliated to the Health sciences institution in Botswana, it provides teaching services to medical students as part of their job training and internships. The hospital has facilities which includes the football field, the gymnasium, tennis court and soft ball courts.

Services 
Sbrana Psychiatric hospital specializes in the treatment of serious mental illness, such as clinical depression, schizophrenia, and bipolar disorder.

Departments

 Biophysicseurochemistry]]
 Neuroimaging and Interventional Radiology
 Neurology
 Neuromicrobiology
 Neuropathology
 Neurophysiology
 Neurosurgery
 Neurovirology
 Nursing
 Neurological Rehabilitation
 Psychiatric Social Work
 Psychiatry
 Psychopharmacology
 Biomedical Engineering
 Psychiatric rehabilitation
 Speech Pathology & Audiology

References

Hospital buildings completed in 2010
Hospitals in Botswana
Hospitals established in 2010